The women's 1500 metres event at the 2006 Commonwealth Games was held on March 20–21.

Medalists

Results

Heats
Qualification: First 4 of each heat (Q) and the next 4 fastest (q) qualified for the final.

Final

References
Results

1500
2006
2006 in women's athletics